Count of Oeiras was a Portuguese title of nobility created by a royal decree, dated July 15, 1759, by King Joseph I of Portugal, and granted to Sebastião José de Carvalho e Melo, head of the Portuguese government.

Later, through another royal decree dated September 16, 1769, the same king upgraded the title to Marquis of Pombal.

List of the Counts of Oeiras (1759) and Marquises of Pombal (1769)
Sebastião José de Carvalho e Melo (1699–1782), 1st Count of Oeiras and 1st Marquis of Pombal;
Henrique José de Carvalho e Melo (1748–1812), 2nd Count of Oeiras and 2nd Marquis of Pombal. Also Chairman of the Lisbon Senate;
José Francisco Xavier Maria de Carvalho Melo e Daun (1753–1821), 3rd Count of Oeiras and 3rd Marquis of Pombal;
Sebastião José de Carvalho Melo e Daun (1785–1834), 4th Count of Oeiras and 4th Marquis of Pombal;
João José Maria de Carvalho de Albuquerque Daun e Lorena, 5th Count of Oeiras;
Manuel José de Carvalho Melo e Daun de Albuquerque Sousa e Lorena (1881–1886), 6th Count of Oeiras and 5th Marquis of Pombal;
Sebastião José de Carvalho e Melo Daun Albuquerque da Silva e Lorena (1849–1874), 7th Count of Oeiras;
António de Carvalho Melo e Daun de Albuquerque e Lorena (1850–1911), 8th Count of Oeiras, 6th Marquis of Pombal and 5th Count of Santiago de Beduído;
Manuel José de Carvalho e Daun de Albuquerque e Lorena (1875– ? ), 9th Count of Oeiras and 7th Marquis of Pombal;
António Severino de Carvalho e Melo Albuquerque Daun Lorena (1901–1943), 10th Count of Oeiras
Sebastião José de Carvalho Daun e Lorena (1903– ? ), 11th Count of Oeiras, 8th Marquis of Pombal and 7th Count of Santiago de Beduído;
Manuel Sebastião de Almeida de Carvalho Daun e Lorena (1930-2022), 12th Count of Oeiras, 9th Marquis of Pombal and 8th Count of Santiago of Beduído.

See also
List of marquisates in Portugal
List of countships in Portugal

External links
Genealogy of the Counts of Oeiras, in Portuguese
Genealogy of the Marquises of Pombal, in Portuguese
Genealogy of the Counts of Santiago de Beduído, in Portuguese

Bibliography
”Nobreza de Portugal e do Brasil" – Vol. III, pages 68/69 and 133/152. Published by Zairol Lda., Lisbon 1989. 

1759 establishments in Portugal